The 2013 Linafoot season (known as the Vodacom Superligue 2013 for sponsorship reasons) was the 52nd edition since its establishment. It began on 20 March 2013 and ended on 23 June 2013. Only the first round was disputed, as halfway into the tournament, the Congolese Association Football Federation (FECOFA) decided to switch to a new competition format, with 'European' style calendar from October to May. The 2013-14 Linafoot was the first edition to be disputed under the new format.

All matches played by TC Elima were awarded as 0-3 victories to its opponents after the completion of the tournament, for fielding an ineligible player, Patou Tingo Disasi.

Clubs
A total of 14 teams are contesting the league, played under a round-robbin format.

League table

References

Linafoot seasons
football
Congo
Congo